The NABC Defensive Player of the Year is an award given annually by the National Association of Basketball Coaches to recognize the top defensive player in United States college basketball. The award has been given since 1987 and was previously known as the Henry Iba Corinthian Award, named after Hall of Fame coach Henry Iba, who coached at Oklahoma State University from 1934 to 1970.

Duke has dominated the award with six recipients who have won a total of nine awards. The only other schools with more than one recipient are Connecticut, with two recipients who combined for four awards, and Ohio State, Kentucky, and Virginia with two recipients who each won the award once. Three players have been named the NABC Defensive Player of the Year on three occasions—Stacey Augmon of UNLV (1989–1991), Tim Duncan of Wake Forest (1995–1997), and Shane Battier of Duke (1999–2001). Greg Oden (2007) and Anthony Davis (2012) are the only freshmen to have won the award.

Two winners of this award were born outside the main territory of the United States. Duncan was born in the United States Virgin Islands, an insular area of the U.S.; by U.S. law, all natives of the USVI are U.S. citizens by birth. Hasheem Thabeet, the 2008 and 2009 winner, is a native of Tanzania.

Key

Winners

Winners by school

See also
NABC Player of the Year
NABC Coach of the Year

References

Awards established in 1987
College basketball trophies and awards in the United States
National Association of Basketball Coaches